General elections were held in Ethiopia in 1965 to elect all members of the Chamber of Deputies, the lower house of the Imperial Parliament. Political parties were banned, so all candidates were independents. Aklilu Habte-Wold remained Prime Minister after the election.

References

Ethiopia
1965 in Ethiopia
General elections in Ethiopia
Non-partisan elections
Election and referendum articles with incomplete results